Bao Chunlai (born 17 February 1983) is a retired left-handed badminton player from China.

Career 
The tall, powerful Bao ranked among the world's leading singles player during the first decade of the 21st century. He was a member of China's world champion Thomas Cup (men's international) teams in 2004, 2006, 2008, and 2010. Bao won medals at three of the six BWF World Championships that he played in, earning a bronze at the 2003 and 2007 editions, and a silver at the 2006 Championships in Madrid, where he upset first seeded Lee Chong Wei in the quarterfinals before falling to teammate Lin Dan in the final. A frequent finalist in top tier international tournaments, Bao had some difficulty breaking through in them until 2009, his most successful year, which saw him capture the Asian Championships, and the German, Singapore, and Japan Opens. In 2010 he upset his superbly accomplished compatriot Lin Dan in the quarterfinals of the prestigious All England Open but was then upset in turn by Japan's Kenichi Tago. Bao's repeat win that year at the German Open was his last tournament victory on the international circuit.

Bao officially retired from the national team on 21 September 2011. In 2015 he appeared in the sports action film Full Strike.

Achievements

World Championships 
Men's singles

Asian Championships 
Men's singles

World Junior Championships 
Boys' singles

BWF Superseries (3 titles, 5 runners-up) 
The BWF Superseries, which was launched on 14 December 2006 and implemented in 2007, is a series of elite badminton tournaments, sanctioned by the Badminton World Federation (BWF). BWF Superseries levels are Superseries and Superseries Premier. A season of Superseries consists of twelve tournaments around the world that have been introduced since 2011. Successful players are invited to the Superseries Finals, which are held at the end of each year.

Men's singles

BWF Grand Prix (5 titles, 10 runners-up) 
The BWF Grand Prix had two levels, the BWF Grand Prix and Grand Prix Gold. It was a series of badminton tournaments sanctioned by the Badminton World Federation (BWF) which was held from 2007 to 2017. The World Badminton Grand Prix sanctioned by International Badminton Federation (IBF) from 1983 to 2006.

Men's singles

Performance timeline

Singles performance timeline

Record against selected opponents 
Record against year-end Finals finalists, World Championships semi finalists, and Olympic quarter finalists, plus all Olympic opponents.

  Chen Hong 2–5
  Chen Jin 5–2
  Chen Long 3–2
  Chen Yu 4–0
  Lin Dan 5–20
  Xia Xuanze 1–1
  Fung Permadi 1–0
  Chou Tien-chen 1–0
  Peter Gade 4–6
  Joachim Persson 4–1
  Kevin Cordón 1–0
  Hu Yun 1–0
  Taufik Hidayat 9–3
  Hendrawan 1–0
  Sony Dwi Kuncoro 7–3
  Simon Santoso 4–0
  Kenichi Tago 0–2
  Shoji Sato 4–0
  Lee Hyun-il 8–4
  Park Sung-hwan 5–0
  Park Tae-sang 2–2
  Shon Seung-mo 3–1
  Lee Chong Wei 4–12
  Przemyslaw Wacha 5–0
  Ronald Susilo 5–2
  Boonsak Ponsana 6–1

Head-to-head vs. top 20 ranked players 
Bao's win–loss record against players who have been ranked world No. 20 or higher is as follows:

Players who have been Olympic, world champion or ranked world No. 1 are in boldface.

* Statistics are correct as of 28 October 2019.

 Players with winning records against Bao 

 Filmography 
 Films 
 Confidant (2019)
 The Match (2016)
 Full Strike (2015)
 Soul Transfer Station'' (2012)

References

External links 
 
  The Official Bao Chunlai Website
  Bao Chunlai's Blog

1983 births
Living people
Sportspeople from Changsha
Badminton players from Hunan
Chinese male badminton players
Badminton players at the 2004 Summer Olympics
Badminton players at the 2008 Summer Olympics
Olympic badminton players of China
Badminton players at the 2002 Asian Games
Badminton players at the 2006 Asian Games
Badminton players at the 2010 Asian Games
Asian Games gold medalists for China
Asian Games bronze medalists for China
Asian Games medalists in badminton
Medalists at the 2002 Asian Games
Medalists at the 2006 Asian Games
Medalists at the 2010 Asian Games
World No. 1 badminton players
20th-century Chinese people
21st-century Chinese people